Yazlık (Turkish: "summer resort") may refer to the following places in Turkey:

 Yazlık, Adıyaman, a village in the district of Adıyaman, Adıyaman Province
 Yazlık, Aydıntepe, a village in the district of Aydıntepe, Bayburt Province
 Yazlık, Balya, a village
 Yazlık, Gölyaka
 Yazlık, Tarsus,  a village in the district of Tarsus, Mersin Province